Liu Zhang ( 190–219), courtesy name Jiyu, was a Chinese politician and warlord who served as provincial governor who lived in the late Eastern Han dynasty of China. He became the Governor of Yi Province (covering present-day Sichuan and Chongqing), succeeding his father Liu Yan and ruled the region until 214, when he surrendered to Liu Bei. Six years later, Liu Zhang again surrendered to Eastern Wu, and died shortly afterwards. Liu Zhang is often considered an incapable leader but is noted to have been the original lord of some of Shu Han's most famous generals and officials such as Fa Zheng, Meng Da, Yan Yan, Liu Ba, Huang Quan, Wu Yi, Li Yan, Dong He and others.

Early life
Liu Zhang was a descendant of Liu Yu, who was Prince of Lu in the early Han dynasty.

The youngest son of Liu Yan, Liu Zhang spent his early career at the Han imperial court as an assistant to his two eldest brothers, Liu Fan and Liu Dan. They served at the court when it was controlled by the warlords Li Jue and Guo Si. Liu Zhang was sent by the imperial court to admonish his father for brutal actions, but upon arriving his father refused to let him go back to the imperial court.

Governorship of Yi Province

In 194, following the deaths of his elder brothers and then his father, he took over the governorship of Yi Province. During his rule over Yi Province, he did not show ambition to expand his territory, but it is said that he was a good ruler and maintained peace in his realm.

In 200, Zhang Lu, who had previously recognised Liu Yan as his master, rebelled against Liu Zhang. Liu Zhang had Zhang Lu's mother, and younger brother(s) executed; the pair became enemies from this point on.

In late 208, Liu Zhang received news that Cao Cao was attacking Jingzhou and had already occupied Hanzhong. He dispatched Yin Pu (阴溥) as an emissary to pay homage to Cao. Cao then recommended that Liu Zhang and his brother Liu Mao (husband of Lady Wu) be granted positions as generals. Liu Mao later died from illness.

In 211, at the suggestion of his adviser Zhang Song, he asked Liu Bei to come to his assistance in the battle against Zhang Lu. The welcoming of Liu Bei was a plan by Zhang Song, Fa Zheng and Meng Da to ultimately make him their leader, since they considered him more ambitious and worthy of serving than Liu Zhang. Wang Lei, Huang Quan, Li Hui and others tried to persuade Liu Zhang not to accept Liu Bei into his territory, but their pleas were ignored and Liu Bei was welcomed as a guest of Liu Zhang where he would go to the front to fight against Zhang Lu.

When Zhang Song's true intentions were revealed to Liu Zhang by Zhang Song's elder brother Zhang Su, he executed Zhang Song and began his battle against Liu Bei, who then began his conquest of Yi Province. Although generals such as Zhang Ren fought hard to defend their master, Liu Bei's forces had the upper hand, and by 214 they had surrounded Yi Province's capital, Chengdu. Liu Zhang's advisers Liu Ba, Dong He and Hu Jing pleaded to their master to resist at all costs, but Liu Zhang rejected their pleas, saying "I don't want my subjects to suffer any more." He then surrendered to Liu Bei.

Later life
Soon after surrendering his territory, Liu Bei sent Liu Zhang and his second son Liu Chan to the western part of Jing Province, on the border with Sun Quan's territory. In the winter of 219-220, however, forces led by Lü Meng, a subordinate of Sun Quan, captured Liu Bei's general Guan Yu and executed him, seizing Jing Province. Liu Zhang and Liu Chan were taken in by the Wu forces, and Sun Quan, seeking to establish a claim to the rest of Liu Bei's territory, appointed Liu Zhang as the Governor of Yi Province, which was his previous appointment before Liu Bei seized it from him. However, Sun Quan made no further attempts to invade Liu Bei's territory, and Liu Zhang died shortly after becoming a vassal under Sun Quan. Liu Chan continued to serve in Eastern Wu while Liu Xun served in Shu Han.

Family
Liu Zhang had at least two sons. His eldest son, Liu Xun, served as a General of the Household of Equipage in the Shu Han state during the Three Kingdoms period. His second son, Liu Chan, accompanied his father to Jing Province after their defeat by Liu Bei and served as Palace Assistant Imperial Clerk (御史中丞) in Eastern Wu during the Three Kingdoms period.

Historical evaluation
In popular accounts of the period, such as the 14th-century historical novel Romance of the Three Kingdoms, Liu Zhang is portrayed as a foolish and incapable ruler.

In Chen Shou's Records of the Three Kingdoms, Liu Zhang's rule is said to have been very peaceful until events of the period brought Liu Bei into his territory. However, Chen Shou, who had once served as an official in Shu Han, and still held some sympathy for his former masters, suggested that Liu Bei rightfully wrested leadership of Yi Province from Liu Zhang.

See also
 Lists of people of the Three Kingdoms

References

 Chen, Shou (3rd century). Records of the Three Kingdoms (Sanguozhi).
 Pei, Songzhi (5th century). Annotations to Records of the Three Kingdoms (Sanguozhi zhu).

Year of birth uncertain
2nd-century births
Generals under Sun Quan
Han dynasty warlords
Liu Yan and associates

Officials under Sun Quan
Political office-holders in Sichuan
Political office-holders in Hubei
Year of death unknown